Geissorhiza melanthera is a small perennial plant of 14–18 cm (5½–7 in) high that is assigned to the Iridaceae. It survives the dry southern summer through storage of its resources in a corm. The stem carries two or three erect, sticky leaves of up to 18 cm (7 in) long, H-shaped in cross-section. This species blooms with six to twelve bilaterally symmetrical flowers, in a spike. Sometimes the spike has one side branch with fewer flowers. Each flower has six pale beige perianth lobes, a purple-red ring around a purple red tube and three blackish stamens. Each flower is subtended by two 1¼–2¼ cm (½–⅞ in) long green bracts. This species was found flowering from the end of September till mid October. It is an endemic of the western slopes of the Piketberg mountains in the Western Cape province of South Africa.

Taxonomy 
The species was described in a publication in 2013 by South African botanists Peter Goldblatt and John Manning. It belongs to the section Engysiphon.

Ecology 
The bee fly Megapalpus capensis is the only species that has been observed visiting the flowers of Geissorhiza melanthera. Remarkably, G. melanthera is the only Iridaceae known to be pollinated by a bee fly. Megapalpus capensis is also known to visit several Pelargonium species, all of which have white, cream or pale pink petals with blackish markings and mostly dark anthers. Gorteria diffusa that is visited by the same bee fly species often has dark spots on some or all of its yellow or orange ray florets, that closely mimic the bee fly's appearance. The species grows in deep sandy soils, on gentle slopes facing south, in an ecosystem called Leipoldtville Sand Fynbos.

Conservation 
Geissorhiza melanthera is known from only two locations, one of which has been requested to allow to reclaim it for the cultivation of rooibos. It is therefore considered endangered.

References 

Plants described in 2013
Endemic flora of South Africa
melanthera
Taxa named by Peter Goldblatt
Taxa named by John Charles Manning